This article features the 1999 UEFA European Under-18 Championship qualifying stage. Matches were played 1998 through 1999. Two qualifying rounds were organised and seven teams qualified for the main tournament, joining host Sweden.

Round 1

Group 1
All matches were played in Spain.

Group 2
All matches were played in Germany.

Group 3
All matches were played in Wales.

Group 4
All matches were played in Ireland.

Group 5

Group 6
All matches were played in Italy.

Group 7
All matches were played in Slovakia.

Group 8
All matches were played in France.

Group 9
All matches were played in Portugal.

Group 10
All matches were played in Switzerland.

Group 11
All matches were played in Ukraine.

Group 12
All matches were played in Hungary.

Group 13
All matches were played in Slovenia.

Group 14
All matches were played in Greece.

Round 2

|}

See also
 1999 UEFA European Under-18 Championship

External links
Results by RSSSF

UEFA European Under-19 Championship qualification
Qual